Bunun can refer to:

 the Bunun people
 the Bunun language